The Fulton School is a Montessori school serving preschool through twelfth grade students in Chesterfield, Missouri.

History 
The first Montessori School in the St. Louis area was founded in Chesterfield in 1962 as a preschool, St. Louis Montessori Academy. In 1971 the school added a program for 6 to 9-year-olds, and by 1977 it had graduated its first sixth grade class. The name of the school was changed in 1984 to Chesterfield Day School. 

A decade later, a second school was opened in nearby St. Albans, Chesterfield Day School-St. Albans. A middle school program for 7th graders was initiated there in 1998. The first upper school senior class graduated in 2004, and in 2007 grades 9–12 officially became St. Albans High School. By 2008, toddlers through grade 8 merged with St. Albans High School, creating The Fulton School at St. Albans, named in honor of Barb Fulton, the long-term head of Chesterfield Day School.
In 1999, a new $4.8 million campus was constructed in Saint Albans. The 40,000-square-foot building on 13 acres had 16 classrooms with room for 300 students.

By 2006, the combined enrollment at the two locations was 425. The Chesterfield location served toddlers through sixth grade, and the St. Albans location taught toddlers through 12th grade.

In October 2021, Chesterfield Day School and The Fulton School at St. Albans announced a merger, effective July 1, 2022. The schools combined as The Fulton School at the Chesterfield location. The campus at St. Albans was to be sold.

With the merger, Kara Fulton Douglass is head of school and Peggy Fiala is assistant head for the Lower School and learning center director.

Demographics
The demographic breakdown of the 98 K-12 students enrolled in 2019-20 was:
Asian - 3
Black - 2
Hispanic - 3
White - 86
Multiracial - 4

References

External links 

 
 What Students Learned When They Made Robotics Relevant to Their Lives

Montessori schools in the United States
Schools in Franklin County, Missouri
Private schools in Missouri
Private middle schools in Missouri